Parián or Pantin, also Parián de Arroceros was an area adjacent to Intramuros built to house Chinese (Sangley) merchants in Manila in the 16th and 17th centuries during the Spanish rule in the Philippines. The place gave its name to the gate connecting it to Intramuros (where most of the Spanish colonial and administrative government was located), the Puerta del Parián.

History 
The Parián rapidly became the commercial centre of Manila. The community had more than a hundred shops comprising the Chinese silk market, small shops of tailors, cobblers, painters, bakers, confectioners, candle makers, silversmiths, apothecaries and other tradesmen.

The location of the Parián moved from time to time and persisted until 1790, when it was torn down to make room for new fortifications on the northern side of Intramuros. The first Parián stood at the current site of the Arroceros Forest Park along the banks of the Pasig River. The second Parián was built in 1583 after the first Parián burned down. The original location is now called Liwasang Bonifacio (formerly Plaza Lawton). The Chinese community later moved to other districts of Manila north of the river including Binondo, Santa Cruz, and Tondo. The second-to-last Parián was octagonal in shape, and also located beside the Pasig River. Finally, Binondo became known as Manila's Chinatown district.

Name
The name "Parián" or "padian" was derived from the Tagalog verb "pariyán" / "padiyán", similar to "puntahan" meaning "to go (to a certain place)", where "pa-" (adverbial prefix) + "diyán" ("there" [near the listener, but far from the speaker]). Meanwhile, "de" is Spanish for "of". Finally, "Arroceros" is the plural form derived from the Spanish for “rice farmers”, where "arroz" (“rice”) + "-ero" (occupational suffix). The name suggests origins as a meeting place for local rice farmers around Manila, before soon becoming a commercial center with Chinese merchants. "Pantin" may be derived from Hokkien , possibly referring to the living quarters upstairs in the structure of the shophouses that many Chinese (Sangley) merchants traditionally lived in.

Current structures

The modern areas of Liwasang Bonifacio and Arroceros Forest Park in the Ermita district occupy the areas once known as Parián. Part of the land of the former Parián is now occupied by the Manila Metropolitan Theater.

A map of Manila published in 1671 published by the Archivo General de Indias, the entire area to the northeast between the walls of Intramuros and the Pasig River encompassed Parián

References

Geography of Manila
History of Manila
Ermita